Sowanda is a Papuan language of Sandaun Province, Papua New Guinea, with a couple hundred speakers in Indonesian Papua.

Dialects
There are three divergent varieties, Waina, Punda and Umeda, which may be distinct languages. They are each spoken in three different villages of Walsa Rural LLG in Sandaun Province:

Waina village, located in Waina ward
Punda village, located in Punda ward
Umeda village, located in Punda ward

References

Border languages (New Guinea)
Languages of western New Guinea
Languages of Sandaun Province